John Watters may refer to:

 John Watters (athlete) (1903–1962), American Olympic runner
 John Watters (cricketer) (1924–2006), Australian cricketer
 John Watters (cyclist) (born 1955), Australian cyclist
 John Watters (gymnast) (1884–1961), British Olympic gymnast

See also 
 John Waters (disambiguation)